Twistetal is a municipality in Waldeck-Frankenberg in northwest Hesse, Germany, southwest of Bad Arolsen.

Geography

Location
The community lies on the river Twiste, a tributary to the Diemel, itself a tributary to the Weser. Twistetal is only a short way downstream from, and southwest of, the Twistesee, a man-made lake. It is located about 6 kilometers southwest from Bad Arolsen.

Neighbouring communities
Twistetal borders in the north and east on the town of Bad Arolsen, in the southeast on the town of Waldeck, in the southwest on the town of Korbach and in the west on the community of Diemelsee (all in Waldeck-Frankenberg).

Constituent communities
Twistetal consists of the following centres:
Berndorf
Elleringhausen
Gembeck
Mühlhausen
Nieder-Waroldern
Ober-Waroldern
Twiste (main town and administrative seat)

Politics
The community's mayor is Stefan Dittmann (FDP), elected in 2018. Twistetal's council is made up of 23 councillors, with seats apportioned thus, in accordance with municipal elections held in March 2021:
CDU 7 seats
FDP 5 seats
SPD 4 seats
Wählergemeinschaft Twistetal 4 seats
Greens 3 seat
Note: Wählergemeinschaft Twistetal is a citizens' coalition.

Infrastructure
Through Twistetal runs Federal Highway (Bundesstraße) 252 from Korbach to Bad Arolsen. Furthermore, Twiste is a stop on the RegionalExpress railway service from Kassel to Korbach.

Outing destinations
Well known points of interest nearby are the Twistesee in the community itself, and a bit farther afield, Bad Arolsen.

References

External links
Twistetal
Twistesee

Waldeck-Frankenberg
Principality of Waldeck and Pyrmont